The Orthodox Church in Italy, also called Chiesa Vecchio-Cattolica in Italia or Old Catholic Church in Italy, is an Old Catholic denomination.

History
The church was founded in 1983 as a traditional Old Catholic church by Italian Orthodox bishop Antonio De Rosso, a former Roman Catholic priest.

After joining traditional Orthodoxy, in 1991 Bishop De Rosso described his ecclesial community as an effort to establish a national Orthodox church in Italy, bringing all the Orthodox parishes and missions under an Italian metropolitan bishop, but only some independent groups have adhered to it.

Antonio De Rosso became bishop of Aprilia and Lazio under the jurisdiction of Metropolitan Kyprianos Koutsoumpas, of the Orthodox Church of Greece (Holy Synod in Resistance). In 1993, the church joined the Bulgarian Orthodox Church and in 1995, De Rosso was enthroned bishop of Ravenna and Italy.

After 1997, the church remained linked with Patriarch 's Bulgarian Orthodox Church – Alternative synod and De Rosso became Metropolitan of Ravenna and Italy. During that year, the church was recognized as an autonomous church and De Rosso became a full member of the Bulgarian alternative synod.
De Rosso sought fellowship with other Greek Old Calendarists and the Bulgarian alternative synod. The Orthodox Church in Italy was in full communion with the Bulgarian alternative synod, the Ukrainian Orthodox Church – Kiev Patriarchate and some other small churches.

After De Rosso died in 2009, the church became an association in memory of him, .

, the church adopted the alternative name Chiesa Vecchio-Cattolica in Italia / Chiesa Ortodossa in Italia ("Orthodox Church in Italy" / " Old Catholic Church in Italy").
So, this jurisdiction is registered before the Italian authorities both as Orthodox Church in Italy and Old Catholic Church in Italy.

Nordic Catholic Church vicariate 
Since 2015, it is a vicariate of the Nordic Catholic Church (NCC). The  is a member church of the Union of Scranton.

See also
Eastern Orthodoxy in Italy
Greek Orthodox Archdiocese of Italy
Montenegrin Orthodox Church

References

External links
 
Other official website

Italy
Eastern Orthodoxy in Italy
Christian organizations established in 1983
Christian denominations established in the 20th century
Independent Catholic denominations
Independent Eastern Orthodox denominations